Giovanni Francesco Cassioni (17th century) was an Italian engraver in wood. He was born in Bologna, and made a number of portraits of painters for Carlo Cesare Malvasia to use in his Felsina Pittrice in 1678.

References

Italian engravers
Baroque engravers
Artists from Bologna
17th-century Italian artists